Telugu Cinema Charitra, (English: The History of Telugu Cinema; Telugu: తెలుగు సినిమా చరిత్ర) is a research book on Telugu Cinema History, by film critic, writer and Journalist B. Venkateshwarlu, published in 1997. The book is considered one of the first major studies of Telugu Film Industry between 1912 and 1995.

Since 1909, filmmaker Raghupathi Venkaiah was involved in producing short films and travelling  to different  regions in Asia to promote fil;m work. in 1921, he produced the silent film called Bhishma Prathigna. He is cited as the father of telugu cinema.

Publishing
The 'Telugu Cinema Charitra' has published by Nextstep Publications & Entertainments, Hyderabad and marketed by Vishalandra Publishing House, Hyderabad.

Content
First published in 1997, it was a keen research covering five major periods: Telugu Cinema in Silent Era (1912–1930) Early Tollywood (1931–1940), Golden Era (1941–1975), Commercial Culture in Telugu Cinema (1976–1995) and The Modern Era.

The book also includes as articles, such Silent Movie, World Cinema, Bollywood, Animation in Tollywood, Parallel Cinema, Telugu Cinema Legends in this film.

Awards
Telugu Cinema Charitra book selected for prestigious Nandi Awards from Government of Andhra Pradesh, India in 1997.

External links
Telugu Cinema Artists Information

Telugu cinema
Nandi Award winners